Hellspawn may refer to:
 Hellspawn (Spawn), a fictional race in the Spawn comic book series
 Hellspawn (comics), a comic book in the Spawn series
 Hellspawn Records, a Swedish independent record label